Byssosphaeria is a genus of fungi in the family Melanommataceae.

References

Melanommataceae
Taxa named by Mordecai Cubitt Cooke